The 2017–18 Texas State Bobcats women's basketball team represents Texas State University in the 2017–18 NCAA Division I women's basketball season. The Bobcats, led by sixth year head coach Zenarae Antoine, play their home games at Strahan Coliseum and were members of the Sun Belt Conference. They finished the season 23–10, 14–4 in Sun Belt play to finish in second place. They advanced to the championship game of the Sun Belt women's tournament where they lost to Little Rock. They received an at-large bid to the WNIT where they lost to Rice in the first round.

Previous season
They finished the season 16–15, 11–7 in Sun Belt play to finish in a tie for fourth place. They lost in the quarterfinals of the Sun Belt women's tournament to Louisiana–Lafayette. They were invited to the WBI where they lost to Eastern Washington in the first round.

Roster

Schedule

|-
!colspan=9 style=| Non-conference regular season

|-
!colspan=9 style=| Sun Belt regular season

|-
!colspan=9 style=| Sun Belt Women's Tournament

|-
!colspan=9 style=| WNIT

See also
 2017–18 Texas State Bobcats men's basketball team

References

Texas State
Texas State Bobcats women's basketball seasons
Texas